Chiddingly is an English village and civil parish in the Wealden District of the administrative county of East Sussex, within historic Sussex, some five miles (8 km) northwest of Hailsham.

The parish is rural in character: it includes the village of Chiddingly and a collection of hamlets: the largest of these being Muddles Green and Thunder's Hill; others being Gun Hill, Whitesmith, Holmes Hill, Golden Cross, Broomham and Upper Dicker. Of the more than 340 dwellings in the parish, over fifty have the word "Farm" in their postal address.

Geography
The parish is in the Low Weald. Like Rome, it is founded upon seven hills: Thunders Hill; Gun Hill; Pick Hill; Stone Hill; Scrapers Hill; Burgh Hill, and Holmes Hill, which is on the A22 road in the south of the parish. Tributaries of the River Cuckmere flow both north and south of the village.

Governance
Chiddingly is part of the electoral ward called Chiddingly and East Hoathly. The population of this ward taken at the 2011 Census was 3,220.

History
The presence of low-grade iron ore in the local sandstone supported Roman mining and smelting in the area.

The Domesday Book of 1086 refers to Cetelingei: the final -ly of the name shows it to have had Saxon origins. The 'Chiddingly Boar', found in 1999, was apparently a silver hat badge of a supporter of Richard III, probably lost or discarded in the 1480s; it is now in the British Museum. There are a large number of manorial buildings in the parish, including Chiddingly Place, rebuilt c. 1574 by Sir John Jefferay, Chief Baron of the Exchequer in 1577; scattered remnants of its E-shaped wings remain, such as the east wing, later called "The Chapel/Chapel Barn" and now known as 'Jefferay House', and sections of the main range west of the demolished Great Hall.

Points of interest

Burgh Hill Farm Meadow is a Site of Special Scientific Interest (SSSI) within the parish. This is a hedgerow-surrounded meadow of an uncommon grassland type.

The Church of England parish church at Chiddingly is of unknown date and dedication, but references to it occur from the 13th century. Today the parish is part of a united benefice with the neighbouring parish of East Hoathly. A Congregational chapel was founded in Chiddingly in 1901.

Chiddingly has a primary school.

The annual Chiddingly Festival includes various entertainments around the village. Chiddingly had four public houses: The Six Bells Inn in the village, The Gun Inn, The Golden Cross Inn (which closed in 2015 and has now been converted to flats), and The Inn on the Park at Golden Cross. Chiddingly has a village hall.

Chiddingly also has a museum and archive. The Farley Farm House gallery features the lives and work of Roland Penrose and Lee Miller and is open for guided tours on pre-determined days.

Stone Hill is a well preserved 600-year-old Tudor-style farmhouse with a large park garden. In the early 20th century, the house was owned by J.M. Barrie, author of Peter Pan, who lived here until 1934. In the 1970s/1980s the property was owned by composer and pianist Keith Emerson (founder of The Nice and Emerson, Lake & Palmer), who lived here with his family. At his Steinway piano in the barn he composed famous music pieces, such as Karn Evil 9 and Piano Concerto No.1.

In 1971 the film director Philip Trevelyan made the documentary film The Moon and the Sledgehammer about the Page family, who lived in a wood outside the village and operated two traction engines: an Allchin and a Fowler.

A maze of willow trees near Whitesmith was planted by a local farmer in the shape of a quotation from the bible.

Notable people
 

Alfred Feist (1835–1873), New Zealand preacher

References

External links
 
 

 
Villages in East Sussex
Civil parishes in East Sussex
Wealden District